Realized variance or realised variance (RV, see spelling differences) is the sum of squared returns. For instance the RV can be the sum of squared daily returns for a particular month, which would yield a measure of price variation over this month. More commonly, the realized variance is computed as the sum of squared intraday returns for a particular day.

The realized variance is useful because it provides a relatively accurate measure of volatility
which is useful for many purposes, including volatility forecasting and forecast evaluation.

Related quantities

Unlike the variance the realized variance is a random quantity.

The realized volatility is the square root of the realized variance, or the square root of the RV multiplied by a suitable constant to bring the measure of volatility to an annualized scale.

Properties under ideal conditions

Under ideal circumstances the RV consistently estimates the quadratic variation of the price process that the returns are computed from.
Ole E. Barndorff-Nielsen and Neil Shephard (2002), Journal of the Royal Statistical Society, Series B, 63, 2002, 253–280.

For instance suppose that the price process  is given by the stochastic integral

 

 

is well defined.

The realized variance based on  intraday returns is given by  where the intraday returns may be defined by
 

Then it has been shown that, as  the realized variance converges to IV in probability. Moreover, the RV also converges in distribution in the sense that

 

is approximately distributed as a standard normal random variables when  is large.

Properties when prices are measured with noise

When prices are measured with noise the RV may not estimate the desired quantity.
This problem motivated the development of a wide range of robust realized measures of volatility, such as the realized kernel estimator.

See also
Volatility (finance)

Notes

Mathematical finance